Mark Jay Anderson (born May 26, 1983) is a former American football defensive end. He was drafted by the Chicago Bears in the fifth round of the 2006 NFL Draft. He played college football at Alabama.

Anderson also played for the Houston Texans, New England Patriots and Buffalo Bills.

Anderson is an uncle to Rodney Anderson, former Oklahoma Sooners and Cincinnati Bengals running back.

Early years
Anderson was born in Tulsa, Oklahoma.  He attended Booker T. Washington High School in Tulsa, and was a letterman in football and basketball.  He was a teammate in both sports of Robert Meachem and Felix Jones, both players who have played in the NFL. In football, he was an All-Metro selection and was named as a Big 12 Prep pick. Mark Anderson graduated from Booker T. Washington High School in 2001. Anderson recorded 104 tackles and 9 sacks along with 9 receptions and 3 touchdowns during his senior season to help the Hornets to an 11–2 record. In his best game he notched 20 tackles, 3 sacks and 2 blocked punts in 1 game as a senior.

College years
Anderson attended the University of Alabama (where he became a member of Omega Psi Phi fraternity). He was a four-year letterwinner at Alabama (2002–05) starting 30 of 50 games, including the final 29 of his career, He finished with 141 career tackles, 13.5 sacks, 25 tackles for loss (TFL) (7th all-time at Alabama), 5 forced fumbles, 3 fumble recoveries and 2 passes deflected. He received second-team all-Southeastern Conference accolades as a senior after pacing Alabama with 7.5 sacks and 18 TFLs among 40 tackles while adding 1 forced fumble and 1 blocked field goal in 12 starts.

Anderson started every contest during junior campaign and ranked 8th on team with 41 tackles while contributing 11 TFLs, 1.5 sacks, 2 forced fumbles, 2 fumble recoveries and 2 passes deflected.

He earned Alabama's Billy Neighbors Most Improved Defensive Lineman award as a sophomore following spring practice and went on to register 47 tackles, 8 TFLs and 2.5 sacks while playing every game and starting 6. Anderson played every game during red-shirt freshman season, finishing with 13 tackles, 2 sacks, 1 TFL, 2 forced fumbles and 1 fumble recovery earning the Ozzie Newsome Most Improved Freshman award following spring practice. He graduated with a degree in consumer science.

Professional career

Pre-draft

Chicago Bears

Anderson was selected with the 159th overall pick (5th round) in the 2006 NFL Draft.  Despite not being an official starter in the Bears Cover 2 defensive scheme, Anderson thrived in his role as a third-down pass rusher, and during the 2006 regular season he totaled 12 sacks, a Chicago Bears rookie record, which was previously held by Brian Urlacher. Anderson also received consideration in 2006 Defensive Rookie of the Year, finishing second in the voting to former Alabama teammate, DeMeco Ryans. He was named to Pro Football Weekly/Pro Football Writers Association All-Rookie team.

He played in all 16 regular season contests gathering 28 tackles to go along with 3 TFLs, 5 QB Hits, 2 PBUs, 4 FFs and 1 FR. Also played in all 3 postseason contests, recording 4 tackles and 1.5 sacks. He combined with Alex Brown for 19 sacks in 2006, the most by a Chicago DE duo since Richard Dent and Trace Armstrong recorded 24 sacks in 1993. Anderson has recorded 4 multiple-sack games in 16 career regular season games played. He registered 0.5 sack in Super Bowl XLI and 1.5 sacks among 4 tackles in 3 postseason contests. He was voted NFL Defensive Rookie of the month in October 2006.

The Bears released Anderson on October 5, 2010.

Houston Texans
On October 6, 2010 Anderson signed with the Houston Texans, where he was reunited with his college teammate, DeMeco Ryans.

New England Patriots
On August 5, 2011, Anderson signed with the New England Patriots. Mark had a rebound year in New England, recording 10 sacks for the Patriots in the regular season. Anderson recorded 1.5 sacks and 5 tackles in Super Bowl XLVI.

Buffalo Bills
On March 21, 2012, Anderson signed a four-year contract worth 20 million dollars with the Buffalo Bills.

In the 2012 season, Anderson had 12 combined tackles and 1 sack through 5 games. However, he suffered a season-ending knee injury against the San Francisco 49ers on October 7, 2012.

On July 23, 2013, Anderson was released by the Bills after just one season.

Post-playing career
On July 31, 2015, Anderson was hired by former Bears head coach and Tampa Bay Buccaneers HC Lovie Smith as a scouting department member.

References

External links
Patriots Bio
http://www.ourlads.com/nfldepthcharts/depthchart/BUF
 https://newsok.com/article/5570786/rodney-anderson-joins-the-family-business

1983 births
Living people
Sportspeople from Tulsa, Oklahoma
Booker T. Washington High School (Tulsa, Oklahoma) alumni
Players of American football from Oklahoma
American football defensive ends
American football linebackers
Alabama Crimson Tide football players
Chicago Bears players
Houston Texans players
New England Patriots players
Buffalo Bills players
African-American players of American football
21st-century African-American sportspeople
20th-century African-American sportspeople